The former Roman Catholic Diocese of the Faroe Islands existed from the 11th century to the Protestant Reformation. The Faroe Islands are now included in the Roman Catholic Diocese of Copenhagen.

History
As recorded in the Færeyinga saga, Sigmundur Brestisson came to the Faroes and converted the people to Christianity more or less one by one. He was eventually attacked at his home by his first (forced) convert, Tróndur í Gøtu, swam to another island to escape, and was finally killed by a farmer for his gold jewelry.

There is some confusion as to when the first bishop for the islands was consecrated, as Adam of Bremen notes that a self-proclaimed bishop of Helgoland was referred to in Latin as the bishop of "Farria." 

The bishops of the Faroe Islands were usually chosen from the canons of the Diocese of Bergen and were originally suffragans of the Archdiocese of Hamburg-Bremen. The diocese was granted to Lund in 1104 and then Niðaros after 1152. The see was based at Kirkjubøur, which legend holds was given to Bishop Orm by Gæsa Sigursdottir as a penance for her having eaten meat during Lent.

Amund Olafson was the last Roman Catholic bishop of the islands and was forced to yield his see and title to the Lutheran superintendent, Jens Riber. Later, only "provosts" were elected. The Catholic clergy were unable to resist the advance of Lutheranism. By the end of 16th century, the Catholic faith had disappeared.

In the Catholic era, at least, no little attention paid to the construction and adornment of churches, as may be seen from the ruins of the unfinished Magnus Cathedral of Kirkjubøur. The thick basaltic walls broken by high, massive windows are evidence that the original builders meant to erect a Gothic church. It remained unfinished.

List of the bishops of the Faroe Islands

 1047-1067—Bernhard Sakseren, missionary bishop  
 Late 11th century—Ryngerus, missionary bishop  
 c. 1100-1137—Gudmund  
 1138-?—Orm, who acquired Kirkjubøur 
 ?-1157—Matthew I [or] Martin I  
 1158-1162—[vacant]  
 1162-1174—Roe, who taught Sverre Sigurdsson, king of Norway after 1184  
 ?-1212—Sven  
 1213?-1214—Olaf  
 1215—[vacant]      
 1216-1237?—Serquirus [or] Sverker  
 ?-1243—Bergsven  
 c. 1245—Nicholas(?) [doubtful]  
 1246-1257—Peter  
 1258-1260/61—[vacant]  
 1261/62-1268—Gaute  
 1269-1308—Erlandr (Erland), who expanded church holdings throughout the islands  
 1309-1312—[vacant]    
 1313?-1316—Lodin of Borgund  
 1317-1319—[vacant]  
 1320-?—Signar  
 ?—Gevard  
 1343-1348—Håvard  
 1349?—[vacant]    
 1350?-1359—Arne I  
 1359-1369—Arne II Svæla  
 ?—Andrew [elected, but likely unconsecrated]  
 ?—Arnold(?) [doubtful]  
 1381?—Richard  
 1385-?—William Northbrigg  
 ?—Vigbold [or] Vigbald  
 1391—Philip Gudbrandsson of Nidaros [elected, but likely unconsecrated]   
 1392?—Halgier [likely unconsecrated]  
 1408-1430?—Jon I the German  
 1432-1434—Severinus, also bishop of Tranquilia  
 1434?—Jon II the Dominican  
 1434-?—Jon III the Chief  
 1441/42?-1451?—Hemming    
 1452?–1453?—[vacant]  
 1453-?—Jon IV  
 ?—Matthew II [or] Martin II  
 ?—Hilary(?) [questionable]  
 ?-1532?—Chilianus  
 1532?–1538?—Ámundur Ólavsson (Amund), last Catholic bishop, ordered by Christian III to leave his mistress and his office  
 1540-1556—Jens Riber, Lutheran, last bishop

See also
Roman Catholicism in the Faroe Islands
The Lutheran Church of the Faroe Islands

References

G.V.C. Young: From the Vikings to the Reformation. A Chronicle of the Faroe Islands up to 1538. Isle of Man: Shearwater Press, 1979.

Attribution

Faroe Islands
Faroe Islands
Former Catholic dioceses in Denmark